Josefa Schuler (born ) is a retired Chilean female volleyball player. She was part of the Chile women's national volleyball team.

She participated at the 2011 Women's Pan-American Volleyball Cup.
On club level she played for Universidad Católica in 2011.

References

External links
 

1995 births
Living people
Chilean women's volleyball players
Place of birth missing (living people)
21st-century Chilean women